YVR Skylynx is a bus operator operating in Vancouver, Squamish and Whistler.

Description 
As of December 12, 2018, YVR Skylynx runs direct from Vancouver International Airport, Vancouver City Centre to Squamish, Creekside Village and Whistler with their Skylynx coach service. This service was previously operated by Pacific Coach Lines. There are 16 daily departures in winter and up to 8 during summer.

Whistler route stops 
YVR Skylynx serves five stops:

 Vancouver International Airport
 Pacific Central Station
 Hyatt Regency Vancouver (near Burrard station)
 Squamish
 Whistler

References

External links 
 

Intercity bus companies of Canada
Companies based in Vancouver
Transport in British Columbia